Miejski Klub Sportowy Pogoń Siedlce (often referred to just as Pogoń Siedlce) is a Polish rugby union club based in Siedlce, Poland that plays in the Rugby Ekstraliga.

Siedlce were promoted from the First Division in 2011-12 up to the Rugby Ekstraliga having finished third. They finished the current season ranked 4th out of the 8 clubs who took part in the Premier League.

History

The club was formed in 1944. They were a First Division team, but earned promotion up to the top flight of Polish rugby.

Stadium
The club plays their home games at the Municipal Stadium. They share it with the football club MKP Pogoń Siedlce

Players

Current squad

References

Polish rugby union teams
Rugby clubs established in 1944
1944 establishments in Poland
Siedlce